Cato Ridge is a town in the KwaZulu-Natal province of South Africa. Organisationally and administratively it is included in the Ethekwini Metropolitan Municipality as a suburb of the Outer West region.

It is situated some 30 km south-east of Pietermaritzburg and 50 km north-west of Durban in the Valley of a Thousand Hills. Named after George Christopher Cato (1814-1893), the first mayor of Durban.

Georgedale which is part of Cato Ridge was the birthplace of James Mpanza who became known as the "Father of Soweto".

References

Populated places in eThekwini Metropolitan Municipality